The Senate Judiciary Subcommittee on Intellectual Property is one of Eight subcommittees within the Senate Judiciary Committee.  The subcommittee was disbanded in 2007, but reinstated in 2019 at the beginning of the 116th Congress.

Jurisdiction
The committee's jurisdiction extends to:
 (1) Intellectual Property laws, including those affecting patents, copyrights and trademarks;
 (2) Oversight of the U.S. Patent and Trademark Office;
 (3) Oversight of the U.S. Copyright Office;
 (4) Oversight of the intellectual property laws, treaties and policies affecting international trade.

Members, 118th Congress

Historical subcommittee rosters

117th Congress

116th Congress

See also
 United States Senate Committee on the Judiciary
 United States Senate Judiciary Subcommittee on Privacy, Technology and the Law

External links
 Senate Judiciary Committee website, Subcommittee page

References

Judiciary Intellectual Property